The Dhund Abbasi is a Pahari-Pothwari tribe found in India and Pakistan.

In Pakistan, its members are  found in parts of Murree and Potohar regions of northern Punjab, Hazara region of Khyber Pakhtunkhwa and the in the Pakistani-controlled territory of Azad Jammu and Kashmir.

In India, the tribe is found in the Indian-controlled union territory of Jammu and Kashmir. In the Kashmir Valley, they are particularly found in the Nowshehra area of Srinagar district and in the Uri and Faqirbagh Chandusa areas of Baramulla district. In Jammu division, the tribe is found in the Poonch and Rajouri districts of the Pir Panjal Region.

The tribe speaks the Pahari dialect of Pahari-Potwari as well as Pashto and Hazarewal Hindko. The tribe considers Sardar Akbar Gahi Khan, also known as Sardar Zarab Khan Abbassi, as its forefather. The tribe gets is name Dhund from the honorary title given to Shah Wali Khan (also known as Dhund Khan) by the Iraqi Sufi scholar, Bahauddin Zakariya.

References

Dhund Abbasi
Social groups of Azad Kashmir
Social groups of Jammu and Kashmir
Social groups of Khyber Pakhtunkhwa
Punjabi tribes